Confucian culture may refer to:
 Confucian art
 Confucianism